James Sydney Clark Fleming  (October 30, 1939 – February 15, 2023) was a Canadian broadcaster and politician.

Fleming was a news reporter for several Toronto radio stations, eventually becoming co-anchor of CHFI morning news, which was simulcast on both CHFI-FM and what was then CHFI-AM. He was the newscaster on Bright and Early on CTV, Canada's first TV network morning news and public affairs show. The show aired in the 1966-67 television season and was not renewed. He also hosted a number of CTV public affairs specials including an interview with John Lennon during his and Yoko Ono's Give Peace A Chance tour of Canada.

Fleming entered politics and was elected to the House of Commons of Canada in the 1972 election as the Liberal Member of Parliament for York West riding in the Toronto area. He was elected chair of the Ontario Liberal caucus by his peers. He served as parliamentary secretary to the Minister of Communications from 1975 to 1976, and then as parliamentary secretary to the Minister of the Environment.

Following the 1980 election, Fleming was named to the cabinet of Prime Minister Pierre Trudeau as Minister of State for Multiculturalism. As minister he was responsible for ensuring multiculturalism was included in the drafting of the Canadian Charter of Rights and Freedoms. He also won cabinet approval for the creation of 
a special parliamentary Committee on Race Relations, had his department sponsor a national Conference on Race Relations and the Law, and provided government support for a national conference on the challenges faced by immigrant women.

Fleming was dropped from cabinet in August 1983. He was offered and appointment to the Canadian Senate but declined and did not run in the 1984 election.

Fleming returned to work in radio and wrote a column for the Toronto Sun.

Fleming died on February 15, 2023, at the age of 83.

References

External links

1939 births
2023 deaths
Liberal Party of Canada MPs
Members of the House of Commons of Canada from Ontario
Politicians from Kitchener, Ontario
CTV Television Network people
Canadian radio news anchors